The Merry Monahans is a 1944 American comedy-drama musical film directed by Charles Lamont and starring Donald O'Connor, Peggy Ryan and Jack Oakie.

The story is of a vaudeville family trying to make money through hard times. The film features the great song and dance duet with O'Connor and Ryan, "I Hate To Lose You".  Film composer Hans J. Salter was nominated for an Academy Award for his score.

Plot
Talented vaudeville family the Monahans have one very big problem in the form of patriarch Pete (Jack Oakie): His heavy alcoholism has gotten the performing clan blacklisted from nearly every significant venue. With little choice but to break away from Pete, his children, Jimmy (Donald O'Connor) and Patsy (Peggy Ryan), devise their own act and take it on the road. The troupe enjoys some success, which motivates Pete to sober up. Hearing of their father's turnaround, they make plans to reunite.

Cast
 Donald O'Connor as Jimmy Monahan
 Peggy Ryan as Patsy Monahan
 Jack Oakie as Pete Monahan
 Ann Blyth as Sheila DeRoyce
 Rosemary DeCamp as Lillian Miles, aka Lillian DeRoyce
 John Miljan as Arnold Pembroke, Has-Been Matinee Idol 
 Gavin Muir as Weldon Laydon, Broadway Talent Scout 
 Isabel Jewell as Rose, aka Rose Monahan, unscrupulous Chorus Girl 
 Ian Wolfe as Clerk
 Robert Homans as Policeman
 Marion Martin as Soubrette
 Lloyd Ingraham as Judge

See also
 List of American films of 1944

References

External links 

 

1944 films
Films directed by Charles Lamont
Films scored by Hans J. Salter
American black-and-white films
Universal Pictures films
1944 comedy-drama films
American comedy-drama films
1940s American films
1940s English-language films